Peter Robert Drummond-Burrell, 2nd Baron Gwydyr, 22nd Baron Willoughby de Eresby PC (19 March 1782 – 22 February 1865), was a British politician and nobleman.

Early life

Born Peter Robert Burrell, he was the eldest of three sons born to Peter Burrell, 1st Baron Gwydyr (1754–1820), and Priscilla Bertie, 21st Baroness Willoughby de Eresby (1761–1828). His paternal grandfather was Peter Burrell, a Member of Parliament and Surveyor General of the Land Revenues of the Crown, and his maternal grandfather was Peregrine Bertie, 3rd Duke of Ancaster and Kesteven. His mother succeeded to a large part of the Ancaster estates in 1779, to the barony of Willoughby of Eresby in 1780 and to the hereditary office of Lord Great Chamberlain.

Career
From 1812 until 1820, he was Member of Parliament for Boston in Lincolnshire. Up to the 1832 Reform Act Drummond-Burrell was a Whig, but by 1841 had changed his allegiance to the Tories.

On 29 June 1820, he succeeded his father as 2nd Baron Gwydyr, 3rd Baronet Burell of Knipp and Deputy Lord Great Chamberlain. On 29 December 1828, he succeeded his mother as 22nd Baron Willoughby de Eresby and joint (1/2) hereditary Lord Great Chamberlain.

As hereditary Lord Chamberlain, he played a leading role at the coronation of Queen Victoria in 1838, holding the crown.

Personal life

On 19 October 1807, he married Sarah Clementina Drummond (1786–1865), daughter of James Drummond, 11th Earl of Perth, and Clementina Elphinstone (a daughter of Charles Elphinstone, 10th Lord Elphinstone). Together, they were the parents of five children:

 Clementina Drummond-Willoughby, 24th Baroness Willoughby de Eresby (1809–1882). who married Sir Gilbert John Heathcote, 1st Baron Aveland.
 Elizabeth Susan Drummond-Burrell (1810–1853), who died unmarried.
 Charlotte Augusta Annabella Drummond-Willoughby (1815–1879), who married the Robert Carrington, 2nd Baron Carrington.
 Frederick Drummond-Burrell (1818–1819), who died in infancy.
 Albyric Drummond-Willoughby, 23rd Baron Willoughby de Eresby (1821–1870), who never married.

His wife died on 26 January 1865. He died less than a month later, on 22 February 1865. They are buried side by side in the churchyard of St Michael and All Angels, Edenham, Lincolnshire. The canopied tomb of their second daughter, Elizabeth Susan (d. 1853) is adjacent, and those of their son Albyric (d. 1870) and grandson Gilbert Heathcote-Drummond-Willoughby, 1st Earl of Ancaster (d. 1910), are nearby. All five tombs are Grade II listed, some jointly.

Legacy
Gwydyr Mansions in Hove, East Sussex, were named after him in honour of his friendship with the Goldsmid family, upon whose land the development was built in 1890.

The Gwydir River in New South Wales was named for him by the explorer Allan Cunningham, for whom he was a patron.

References

1782 births
1865 deaths
22
Peter
Peter
Lord-Lieutenants of Caernarvonshire
Members of the Privy Council of the United Kingdom
Drummond-Burrell, Peter
Drummond-Burrell, Peter
Drummond-Burrell, Peter
Drummond-Burrell, Peter
UK MPs who inherited peerages